Sean B. Carroll (born September 17, 1960) is an American evolutionary developmental biologist, author, educator and executive producer. He is a distinguished university professor at the University of Maryland and professor emeritus of molecular biology and genetics at the University of Wisconsin–Madison. His studies focus on the evolution of cis-regulatory elements in the regulation of gene expression in the context of biological development, using Drosophila as a model system. He is a member of the National Academy of Sciences, of the American Philosophical Society (2007), of the American Academy of Arts and Sciences and the American Association for Advancement of Science. He is a Howard Hughes Medical Institute investigator.

Carroll has received the Shaw Scientist Award from the Greater Milwaukee Foundation, the Stephen Jay Gould Prize from the Society for the Study of Evolution, the Benjamin Franklin Medal in Life Science, and the Lewis Thomas Prize at Rockefeller University.

Biography

Sean B. Carroll was born in Toledo, Ohio. He has stated that, as a child, he would flip over rocks looking for snakes while attending Maumee Valley Country Day School, and at age 11 or 12, he started keeping snakes. This activity led him to notice the patterns on the snakes and wonder how those form. He got his B.A. in Biology at Washington University in St. Louis, his Ph.D. in immunology from Tufts University and did post-doctoral work at the University of Colorado Boulder.

Career

Carroll is at the forefront of evolutionary developmental biology (also called "evo-devo"), studying how gene changes control the evolution of body parts and patterns. He is the Allan Wilson Professor of Molecular Biology and Genetics at the University of Wisconsin–Madison and an investigator for the Howard Hughes Medical Institute. In 1987, Carroll set up a laboratory at the University of Wisconsin-Madison "focused on understanding how genes get used in different ways to generate the diversity of form that we see". The Laboratory of Cell and Molecular Biology lists Carroll's interests as "Genetic control of body pattern in fruit flies, butterflies, and other animals". Carroll's team has shown, in a series of papers, how the activation of genes during the embryonic stages of the Drosophila fruit fly controls the development of its wings. The team has been searching for the butterfly's counterparts of these genes.

In 2010, he was named vice-president for science education of the Howard Hughes Medical Institute. In 2011, the HHMI launched a documentary film initiative to produce science features for television, to which Carroll was appointed as one of the executive producers. In 2012, one such film, called The Day the Mesozoic Died, retracing the investigation that led to the discovery of the asteroid collision that triggered the mass extinction at the end of that Era, was introduced by Carroll at a National Teacher's Conference.

Carroll is a proponent of the extended evolutionary synthesis.
Since 2013, Carroll has been listed on the Advisory Council of the National Center for Science Education. 

From September 2009 to March 2013, he wrote a column for The New York Times called "Remarkable Creatures", where he discussed findings in animal evolution.

Awards 

In 1989, he received the Shaw Scientist Award from the Greater Milwaukee Foundation.
In 2010, Carroll received the Stephen Jay Gould Prize from the Society for the Study of Evolution. In 2012, he was awarded the Benjamin Franklin Medal in Life Science from the Franklin Institute "for proposing and demonstrating that the diversity and multiplicity of animal life is largely due to the different ways that the same genes are regulated rather than to mutation of the genes themselves." 
In 2016, he was awarded the Lewis Thomas Prize at Rockefeller University.

Selected works

Books

From DNA to Diversity: Molecular Genetics and the Evolution of Animal Design, with Jennifer Grenier and Scott Weatherbee (2004, Wiley-Blackwell)
Endless Forms Most Beautiful: The New Science of Evo Devo and the Making of the Animal Kingdom (2005, W. W. Norton & Company)
The Making of the Fittest: DNA and the Ultimate Forensic Record of Evolution (2006, W. W. Norton & Company)
Into the Jungle: Great Adventures in the Search for Evolution (2008, Benjamin Cummings)
Remarkable Creatures: Epic Adventures in the Search for the Origin of Species (2009, Houghton Mifflin Harcourt)
Brave Genius: A Scientist, a Philosopher, and Their Daring Adventures from the French Resistance to the Nobel Prize (2013, Crown)
The Serengeti Rules: The Quest to Discover How Life Works and Why It Matters (2016, Princeton University Press)
A Series of Fortunate Events: Chance and the Making of the Planet, Life, and You (2020), Princeton University Press, .

Magazine articles

The Origins of Form: Ancient genes, recycled and re-purposed, control embryonic development in organisms of striking diversity (2005, Natural History Magazine) 
God as Genetic Engineer. A review of Michael Behe's book "The Edge of Evolution: The Search for the Limits of Darwinism" (2007, Science Magazine) 
Regulating Evolution: How Gene Switches Make Life (2008, Scientific American)

Reception

Science writer Peter Forbes, writing in The Guardian, calls Endless Forms Most Beautiful an "essential book" and its author "both a distinguished scientist ... and one of our great science writers." In Forbes's view, in The Serengeti Rules Carroll "manages to unite natural history with the hard science of genomics." In her article on Science Based Medicine titled The Essential Role of Regulation In Human Health and In Ecology: The Serengeti Rules, Harriet A. Hall says "This book is a great way to learn about the rules of regulation and about how science works. It's not just a painless way to learn, its positively fun." The documentary film, The Serengeti Rules, was released in 2018 and is based on Carroll's book.

Louise S. Mead, reviewing The Making of the Fittest for the National Center for Science Education, notes that Carroll describes "some of the overwhelming evidence for evolution provided in DNA", using different lines of inquiry such as DNA sequences that code for genes no longer in use, and evidence of evolutionary change. Mead notes that evolutionary theory has predictive power, as with icefish whose ancestors had hemoglobin; as they no longer need it in their icy environment, they have lost it.

Douglas H. Erwin, reviewing Endless Forms Most Beautiful for Artificial Life, remarks that life forms from Drosophila to man have far fewer genes than many biologists expected – in man's case, only some 20,000, which is about the same as a fly. He notes the "astonishing morphological diversity" of animals coming from "such a limited number of genes". He praises Carroll's "insightful and enthusiastic" style, writing in a "witty and engaging" way, pulling the reader into the complexities of Hox and PAX-6, as well as celebrating the Cambrian explosion of life forms, and much else.

References

External links
 
 UMD faculty page
 
 
 
 

Evolutionary biologists
American science writers
Washington University in St. Louis alumni
Tufts University School of Medicine alumni
Living people
Howard Hughes Medical Investigators
1960 births
American skeptics
Critics of creationism
Extended evolutionary synthesis
University of Wisconsin–Madison faculty
Members of the American Philosophical Society
Fellows of the American Academy of Arts and Sciences
Fellows of the American Association for the Advancement of Science
Members of the United States National Academy of Sciences